Donald Richard Vroon (born 1942) is an American music critic, chief editor and co-owner of American Record Guide, a bi-monthly magazine containing reviews of classical music events, compact discs, DVDs, and books related to classical music as well as a section on classical musicians and ensembles.

Work in radio 
He also worked in radio, at WNYC in 1976 (programming) and as a classical music host at WNED-FM (1977 to 1985) and overnight at WGUC (from 1985 to 1987).

Work in print media 
Vroon began writing for the American Record Guide in 1983. He became its chief editor and co-owner with his husband, Plein Air artist Ray Hassard, in 1987, moving its headquarters to Cincinnati.
In July 2014 Rowman & Littlefield published a book entitled Classical Music in a Changing Culture: Essays from the American Record Guide, a collection of essays from his "Critical Convictions" column in the magazine. As Vroon argues, since all criticism is cultural criticism, music criticism in the broadest sense—from its composition to its distribution to its reception—is a window onto broader culture issues.

Perspectives 
Vroon has expressed strong—and, occasionally, unusual—viewpoints, which include distastes for historical performance practice and much contemporary music.  He has lauded the expressive power of eighteenth- and nineteenth-century masterworks and criticized the decline of modern culture (reflected, among many other things, by the increasing pervasiveness of mass media). These viewpoints and others he shares in his reviews and in an editorial column, "Critical Convictions," in the magazine, a selection of which was published by Rowman & Littlefield in 2014 (see above). The magazine publishes very little in the way of reader response to these editorials.
In "Elitism," Vroon espouses snobbish tropes, such as the idea that "Enlightened minds [such as lovers of classical music] don't read comic books and don't find fulfillment in popular music!" [Classical Music in a Changing Culture (Lanham, Maryland: Rowman & Littlefield, 2014), p. 4] He stereotypes women as interested in shopping and little more, and concludes by valuing elitism because "only an elite offers any hope." [Ibid., p. 6]

Family & early years 
Vroon is the son of Peter R. Vroon, former Republican member of the Pennsylvania House of Representatives.

According to biographical sources, Vroon grew up in New York and listened only to classical music. He developed an interest in theology, which led him to earn a Master of Theology degree (ThM) degree from Princeton Theological Seminary in 1968.  He worked as a Methodist minister from 1964 to 1972 and as a part-time instructor of Christian ethics at the University of Buffalo from 1982 to 1985.

References
General references
 Who's Who in Entertainment, Second edition, 1992–1993, Marquis Who's Who, Wilmette, IL (1992)
 Who's Who in Entertainment, Third edition, 1998–1999, Marquis Who's Who, New Providence, NJ (1997)
Inline citations

External links

American musicologists
Living people
1942 births
American LGBT writers
Place of birth missing (living people)
People from New York (state)
Princeton Theological Seminary alumni
University at Buffalo faculty